Dangerous Mission is a 1954 American Technicolor thriller film starring Victor Mature, Piper Laurie, Vincent Price and William Bendix. The film was produced by Irwin Allen, directed by Louis King and released by RKO Radio Pictures. It is remembered today mainly for its use of 3-D film technology.

Plot
Louise Graham witnesses the murder of a crime boss and flees the city to hide out in Glacier National Park. She is followed by two men, Matt Hallett and Paul Adams, one of whom is a federal agent charged with protecting her, the other a ruthless killer determined to murder her.

Cast
 Victor Mature as Matt Hallett
 Piper Laurie as Louise Graham
 William Bendix as Chief Ranger Joe Parker
 Vincent Price as Paul Adams
 Betta St. John as Mary Tiller
 Dennis Weaver as The Ranger Clerk
 Harry Cheshire as Mr. Elster
 Steve Darrell as Katoonai Tiller
 Walter Reed as Ranger Dobson
 Marlo Dwyer as Mrs. Elster

Production
The film was also known as Glacier and Rangers of the North. Filming began in July 1953.

The film is set in Glacier National Park, Montana and was largely filmed there.

Reception

Critical response
In a contemporary review for The New York Times, critic Bosley Crowther called the film "unnatural, uninteresting and drab" and wrote: "Since our great national parks are open to virtually anyone who cares to visit them, there probably is no way of preventing their occasionally being exploited and abused. And that is most certainly what has happened to Glacier Park in the R. K. O. film ... [A] company of Hollywood people has the cheek to play a tale that hasn't the vitality or intelligence of a good comic-strip episode. It is a miserably dull and mixed-up fable about a hunt for a missing witness to a crime, with Vincent Price eventually emerging as some sort of villain, which is obvious all along."

More recently, critic Dennis Schwartz has also reviewed the film negatively, writing: "An action movie made for 3D that starts off looking like a real corker but winds up looking as stale as month-old bread. Director Louis King (Frenchie/Green Grass of Wyoming) never steers it away from its awkwardness. Despite a fine cast (unfortunately they all give corpse-like performances), capable screenwriters Charles Bennett and W.R. Burnett, and veteran story writers Horace McCoy and James Edmiston, the film is at best bearable ... William Bendix plays a blustery park ranger chief who knew Mature from their days as marines. His mission, in this film, is to put out a forest fire that has nothing to do with the plot, but looks swell on 3D. The film is noteworthy for the clumsy job Gene Palmer turned in as editor."

References

External links
 
 
 
 
 

1954 films
1950s action thriller films
1954 3D films
American action thriller films
American 3D films
Color film noir
1950s English-language films
Films scored by Roy Webb
Films produced by Irwin Allen
Films set in Montana
Films shot in Montana
RKO Pictures films
Films directed by Louis King
1950s American films